The Triumph Infor Rocket Streamliner (previously known as the Hot Rod Conspiracy/Carpenter Racing Castrol Rocket or Triumph Castrol Rocket) is a streamliner motorcycle built to challenge the motorcycle land speed record. The streamliner shell is a monocoque constructed from carbon fiber/kevlar.

The motorcycle was designed and built by Matt Markstaller, an engineer who designed and built a wind tunnel for tractor-trailers in Portland, Oregon.  It was ridden by Jason DiSalvo, followed by Guy Martin.

After two abandoned attempts due to poor conditions on the salt, the team announced that it would return to Bonneville Speedway in August 2016 to break the motorcycle world land speed record.

References

External links

Land speed record motorcycles
Streamliner motorcycles
Motorcycles of the United States